Kunal (or Kunala; born 263 BC) was a crown prince of the Maurya Empire.

Kunal may also refer to:

 Kunal, Haryana, an Indus Valley Civilization site in India

People with the given name
Kunal Kohli, Indian director
Kunal Nayyar (born 1981), British actor
Kunal Kapoor (actor, born 1977), Indian actor
Kunal Kapoor (actor, born 1959), Indian actor
Kunal Khemu, Indian actor
Kunal Ganjawala (born 1972), Indian singer
Kunal Basu (born 1956), Indian novelist
Kunal Singh (1977–2008), Indian Tamil actor known as Kunal

See also